Copelatus scutatus is a species of diving beetle. It is part of the subfamily Copelatinae in the family Dytiscidae. It was described by Félix Guignot in 1952.

References

scutatus
Beetles described in 1952